Lier may refer to:

 Lier, Belgium
 Lier, Norway
 De Lier, Netherlands
 Li Er, also known as Laozi, a Chinese philosopher

See also 
 Leer (disambiguation)
 Leer, Michigan, hamlet in Long Rapids Township, Michigan, USA named after Lier, Norway
 Liar (disambiguation)